Moline is an unincorporated community in western Lake Township, Wood County, Ohio, United States.

Moline does not have a post office. It shares its ZIP code with neighboring Walbridge (43465).

Geography
Moline is located at the intersection of Moline-Martin Road and East Broadway, approximately six miles south of Toledo.  Moline is situated just south of State Route 795, which is the primary east-west artery of Lake Township, connecting Interstate 280 to Interstate 75 and the Ohio Turnpike (Interstates 80 and 90). Its altitude is 623 feet (190 m).

In pop culture
On the TV show Grey's Anatomy, April Kepner's family lives on a farm in Moline, Ohio.

References

Unincorporated communities in Wood County, Ohio
Unincorporated communities in Ohio